The Englishtown Formation is a geologic formation in Delaware. It preserves fossils dating back to the Cretaceous period.

See also

 List of fossiliferous stratigraphic units in Delaware
 Paleontology in Delaware

References
 

Cretaceous Delaware